Groszek is a  Polish and Yiddish (Polish Jewish) surname. The word (among other meanings) is a diminutive of grosz, a Polish lesser coin. Therefore, the surname may be an occupational surname for a person dealing with money or a nickname for a wealthy of greedy person.

Notable people with the surname include:

 (1929-2018), Polish scoutmaster and teacher 
Marcia Groszek, American mathematician
 (born 1951), Polish banker, economist, and former vice-president of the Polish Bank Association

See also

References

Occupational surnames
Polish-language surnames